Raj Bhavan (translation: Government House) is the official residence of the governor of Tripura. The incumbent governor of Tripura is Hon'ble Shri Tathagata Roy. The residence is located in the state's capital city of Agartala. A new Raj Bhavan was built and inaugurated in April 2018. The previous Raj Bhavan was built in 1917, and was known as the Pushbanta Palace prior to India's independence. The previous Raj Bhavan edifice is intended to become a museum and research center in honor of King of Tripura, Maharaja Birendra Kishore Manikya.

History

See also
  Government Houses of the British Indian Empire

References

External links
 
 Website
 https://web.archive.org/web/20061027143752/http://www.sarkaritel.com/states/governors_state.htm
 https://web.archive.org/web/20070312121552/http://www.westtripura.nic.in/tripuratourism.htm

Governors' houses in India
Government of Tripura
Buildings and structures in Agartala
Houses completed in 2018